Roy Reding, born 17 July 1965 in Luxembourg City, is a Luxembourgish Member of Parliament, lawyer, politician and vice-president of the ADR, as well as treasurer of the Alliance of European Conservatives and Reformists (AECR), a centre-right eurosceptic European political party, of which the ADR is a member.

Life

Reding spent his childhood in Bech, a village near Echternach and has lived in Fischbach, Mersch and in Folschette by Rambrouch, with his current residence being in Luxembourg City. Reding is the father of four children and is married to Karine Reuter, former Judge and currently Notary in Pétange. Reding went to school in Echternach with, among others, the former Justice and Culture Minister Octavie Modert and the former Secretary-General of the DP, Georges Gudenburg. Having obtained his qualification of secondary education, Reding studied Law at the Paul Cézanne University in Aix-en-Provence, whence he obtained a Bachelor of Laws. Ensuing this degree, Reding obtained a Master of Laws from the University Robert Schumann in Straßburg.

Having obtained his master's degree, Reding started working on 1 August 1989 as a solicitor in the luxembourgish bank BGL BNP Paribas. In May 1990, Reding received his official admission to the Luxembourgish Bar, allowing him to open a chancery in 1993, namely the Chancery Reding and Felten in Luxembourg City. After the separation of the two associates, Reding opened his own chancery in the city centre, located in the Rue de l'Eau. He retired as a lawyer in 2019 in order to be able to act more independently as an MP and not fall under the possible consequences from the bar. He stated "retiring as a lawyer gives me the possibility to talk freely on each subject without fearing professional repercussions 

In December 2022, he was convicted of fraud after selling a property and failing to disclose to the buyer that part of it was legally uninhabitable. He was given a suspended 1-year prison sentence and a €50,000 fine.

Local politics
Reding's first became involved in politics at the age of 15, when he became a member of the LSAP and their youth organization JSL. He engaged actively in politics whilst at school. He was the elected school representative in the Conseil d'Education as well as chief editor of the school newspaper De Maulwuerf. During his time at university, he was president of the National Union of Luxembourgish Students (UNEL) as well as the president of the Socialist Students (Etudiants Socialistes). He also worked as a free-lance journalist for the Tageblatt during this time. In 1999 he was elected as a councilman in the Council of Fischbach, receiving the second largest share of the vote.

National Politics
The trigger for Reding's entry into national politics was the Treaty establishing a Constitution for Europe, (commonly referred to as the European Constitution or as the Constitutional Treaty), against which Reding vehemently protested with the viewpoint that the government was manipulating voters with false statements and propaganda in order to get them to ratify the Treaty. Reding became politically active in the ADR following this, whose views he shared and for whom he ran for the since 2005 unoccupied seat in the Council of State of Luxembourg. At the National Congress of the ADR in 2006, Reding was voted into the position of Secretary-General.

During the Parliamentary elections of 7 June 2009 and the 2009 European Parliament election, Reding ran for a seat in both the National and EU parliaments. He narrowly missed out on a seat in the national parliament by a couple of hundred votes, coming second on the ADR centre list behind Jacques-Yves Henckes. In the National Congress of 25 March 2012, Reding was voted into the position of Vice-President.

In the snap elections of October 2013, Reding reclaimed the centre seat for the ADR after Jacques-Yves Henckes left the party. On 13 November 2013, Reding was sworn in as a Member of Parliament. He became a member of the Parliamentary Commissions for Justice, Agriculture and Viticulture, Consumer Protection, Secondary Education, Media and Communication, and Research. He was also elected as a representative for Luxembourg in the Benelux Parliament. Reding was re-elected in the October 2018 elections, improving his vote share by 12.4% to a total of 6,319.

. dok 
Reding is presenter on the Luxembourgish Channel ".dok". Primarily, the socially dedicated lawyer presents his show "Vu Fall zu Fall" in which he answers complicated legal questions as well as reporting on interesting developments in the Judicial landscape of Luxembourg, along with his wife Karine Reuter. Reding also presents the show City Talk in which he discusses political themes about Luxembourg City with his guests.

Re-Entry into Communal Politics 
In the Communal Elections of October 2017, Reding was elected into the Communal Council of Luxembourg City. He sits as the sole representative of the ADR on the Council, and is a member of the Commission on Urban Development.

References

External links
Homepage von Roy Reding
Blog von Roy Reding
Artikel von Reding, 17 Jahre (PDF; 293 kB)

1965 births
Living people
Alternative Democratic Reform Party politicians
Luxembourgian politicians
Members of the Chamber of Deputies (Luxembourg)